Sir John Sherbrooke was built in 1804 in Nova Scotia. She first appeared in the British registers in 1815 and was wrecked in 1816.

Sir John Sherbrooke first appeared in Lloyd's Register (LR) in 1816  with T.Garrett, master, changing to D. Cowan, N.Shanon, owner, and trade Liverpool–Newfoundland, changing to Liverpool–Jamaica.  

Captain Cowan was sailing from Jamaica to New York when Sir John Sherbrooke struck a reef in the Dry Tortugas on 19 October 1816 and bilged. The crew was saved, and proceeded to make off with the $60,000 in specie that she was carrying.

Citations

1804 ships
Age of Sail merchant ships of England
Maritime incidents in 1816